The motorways in Albania are the controlled-access highway system in Albania predominantly under the supervision of the Ministry of Infrastructure and Energy.

The longest motorway in Albania constitute the A1 motorway which connects Durrës in Albania to Pristina in Kosovo. There is also a motorway from Fier to Vlorë, the A2 motorway, as well as the A3 motorway from Tirana to Elbasan. The majority of the motorways are still under construction or in various stages of development such as the bypasses of Fier, and Tirana and the planned sections between Thumana and Kashar, and between Milot and Balldren. In some ways, Albanian motorway road signs bears some similarity to those of Italy.

Motorways

Completed

Future projects

See also  

 Highways in Albania
 Transport in Albania
 Economy of Albania

References

External links 

 Ministry of Infrastructure and Energy  Official Website
 Albanian Road Authority Official Website